The Lucille Ball Desi Arnaz Museum,, formally The Lucille Ball Desi Arnaz Museum & Center for Comedy and commonly known as the Lucy Desi Museum, is a museum at 2 West 3rd Street, Jamestown, New York that is affiliated with the nearby National Comedy Center with which it shares executive director Journey Gunderson. The museum is dedicated to the lives and careers of Lucille Ball and Desi Arnaz. Jamestown was Ball's birthplace.  

The museum opened in 1996 and as of 2015, drew approximately 25,000 international visitors annually. The Comedy Center followed in 2016.

Displays
In addition to re-created sets, including the series' iconic living room, the museum showcases the work of Desilu Studios in an adjacent building, houses the couple's artifacts and memorabilia including Ball's Emmy Awards, and an event facility dubbed the Tropicana Room, a recreation of Ricky Ricardo's nightclub.

Comedy festival

Formerly, each May, the museum celebrated Lucy-Desi Days, which featured several events including panel discussions with those closest to Ball and Arnaz. In the spring of 1989, Ball was meant to attend the commencement ceremony at Jamestown Community College and receive an honorary degree from the institution, and during the same weekend she planned to attend the Lucille Ball Festival of New Comedy, which she had developed in cooperation with the Arts Council of Jamestown, but she died shortly before the scheduled event.

In 1991, the National Comedy Center established the annual Lucille Ball Comedy Festival, which is now held every August to honor Ball's August 6 birthday. Past festivals have featured Ray Romano, Ellen DeGeneres, Lewis Black, Billy Gardell, Jay Leno, Bill Engvall, Joan Rivers, Paula Poundstone, Kathleen Madigan, Tammy Pescatelli, and many more.

References

External links

1996 establishments in New York (state)
Ball
Jamestown, New York
Lucille Ball
Mass media museums in New York (state)
Museums established in 1996
Museums in Chautauqua County, New York
Women's museums in New York (state)